Piperocaine is a local anesthetic drug developed in the 1920s and used as its hydrochloride salt for infiltration and nerve blocks.

Synthesis

Alkylation between 3-chloropropyl benzoate [942-95-0] (1) and Pipicoline [109-05-7] (2) provides piperocaine (3).

See also
Hexylcaine

References

Further reading 
 </ref>

Local anesthetics
Piperidines
Benzoate esters